Aşağı Gəyəli (also, Ashaghy Geyali) is a village in the Zangilan Rayon of Azerbaijan.

See also
Yuxarı Gəyəli

References 

Populated places in Zangilan District